Secure may refer to:

 Security, being protected against danger or loss(es)
Physical security, security measures that are designed to deny unauthorized access to facilities, equipment, and resources
Information security, defending information from unauthorized access, use, disclosure, disruption, modification, perusal, inspection, recording or destruction
Secure communication, when two entities are communicating and do not want a third party to listen in
 Securitate (Romanian for "security"), the secret service of Communist Romania
 Security (finance), e.g. secured loans
Secured transaction, a loan or a credit transaction in which the lender acquires a security interest in collateral owned by the borrower
Secured creditor, a creditor with the benefit of a security interest over some or all of the assets of the debtor
 Secure (G5), a NatureServe conservation status similar to "Least Concern", indicating a species is not at risk of extinction
 Sécure River, Bolivia

See also
 
 
 
 
 Insecure